Manjur Karim Piash (1958 – October 13, 2014) popularly known as Piash Karim was a professor, researcher and political commentator with specializations in political economy, political sociology, nationalism and social theory. After independence, he completed his bachelor's degree from the University of Dhaka and went to the US for higher studies. In his long career as a teacher, he taught at the University of Nebraska–Lincoln, Culver–Stockton College and BRAC University. Karim had authored several of books and journals on nationalism and sociology.

Early life and education
Karim was born in 1958 in Comilla. His father M.A. Karim was a member of the founding committee of the Comilla unit of Awami League, and served as the treasurer of Awami League district unit for a long time. His uncle served as the second Inspector General of Police. Piash Karim received his primary education from Comilla Modern School and secondary education from Comilla Zila School. He completed his higher secondary education from Adamjee Cantonment College, Dhaka.

Later, Karim obtained his Bachelor of Arts degree from the University of Dhaka. He completed his master's degree and PhD in Sociology at Kansas State University after moving to the United States. He was arrested by Pakistan Army of occupation during the Bangladesh Liberation War of 1971 for distributing leaflets in favour of the freedom movement of Bangladesh.

Career
Karim, after completing his master's degree and PhD, served as a faculty member of two American universities for seventeen years. He joined the University of Nebraska–Lincoln as a faculty member and was promoted to a Professor of the university. Later, he worked as a Professor at Culver–Stockton College, Missouri for another few years. In 2007 he returned to Bangladesh and joined BRAC University as a Professor of Economics and Social Sciences Department. In Bangladesh, he wrote several articles on nationalist politics, civil society and media activism.

Views 
Karim was opposed to the Shahbag protests and criticized the neutrality of the International Crimes Tribunal. As result, his house was attacked by bombs and death threats were made against him.

Personal life and death
Karim was married to Dr. Amena Mohsin, a Professor of International Relations at the University of Dhaka. His only son lives in Dhaka. On October 13, 2014, he died in a cardiac arrest on his way to Square Hospital from his home at the age of 56. Nobel Laureate and prominent economist Dr. Muhammad Yunus mourned his sudden death terming him as a "fearless and principled intellectual". After his death leftist student organizations threatened to desecrate his body if it was brought to the Shaheed Minar.

References 

1958 births
2014 deaths
University of Nebraska–Lincoln faculty
People from Comilla District
University of Dhaka alumni
Culver–Stockton College faculty
Academic staff of BRAC University